Cloverdale is a city in Sonoma County, California, United States; it is both the westernmost and the northernmost city in the San Francisco Bay Area. The San Francisco and North Pacific Railroad reached Cloverdale in 1872. The Cloverdale Rancheria of Pomo Indians of California is headquartered there. The population was 8,618 at the 2010 census.

History
Cloverdale began as an early stagecoach stop, known as Markleville, on the Rancho Rincon de Musalacon Mexican grant.  In 1856, R.B. Markle and W.J. Miller bought , which included the present site of the town, from Johnson Horrell.  In 1859, James Abram Kleiser bought Markle's interest, and the town was laid out. The town was incorporated when the San Francisco and North Pacific Railroad arrived in 1872.  By 1878, the railroad service provided three trains a day between Cloverdale and Ferries of San Francisco Bay.

In 1881, Jules Leroux and Armand Dehay established a colony south of Cloverdale named "Icaria Speranza", based on the French Utopian movement, the Icarians.  The settlement ended in 1886 and today, there is a marker south of town where the schoolhouse was located.

Cloverdale suffered severe economic hardship, losing 500 to 600 manufacturing jobs between 1988 and 1994, with the closing of a fire equipment factory and the shrinking of the logging industry. On July 6, 2005, Cloverdale began its economic reform with the "RTB" (Real-Estate Transfer Bureau) plan granting money for businesses and commerce to return to the city. This plan fell through as the grant was moved to Los Altos, California and changed to the "1750" plan. In 1993, 300 jobs were eliminated alone when Louisiana-Pacific closed its lumber mill.  In 1994, Highway 101, which formerly bisected the town, was rerouted around town with a bypass. Some businesses closed, and many natives believed the bypass radically changed the town's character.

Since the bypass, signs of civic revival have occurred with the development of pedestrian-friendly sidewalks, a performing arts center, a brewpub, and a downtown plaza hosting live concerts and a farmers' market. In 1997, Clover Springs, a development with 362 houses, was opened on the south end of town. In 2011, the Sonoma County Agricultural Preservation and Open Space District transferred  of former ranchland to the City of Cloverdale for use as a park and open-space preserve.

Cloverdale Rancheria of Pomo Indians

The Cloverdale Rancheria of Pomo Indians is a landless federally recognized tribe with a membership of almost 500.  In 2008, the Tribe acquired  at the southern end of town.

The Rancheria is a community of Pomo Indians who are indigenous to Sonoma County and speak the Southern Pomo language.  Pomo people are renowned for their basket weaving, done by both men and women.  Elsie Allen, considered to be one of the best California basketweavers of her generation,  was a member of the Rancheria and spent part of her childhood there.

According to tribal history, the Pomo people lived peacefully in the area since ancient times.  The Rancheria was created by the federal government in 1921, when the tribe became federally recognized, and deeded the tribe  on the southern edge of town.

In 1958, the Rancheria was terminated, along with 43 other rancherias in California.  This process transferred tribal community land to private ownership.

In 1979, Tillie Hardwick, a Pomo woman, filed a class action suit on behalf of 16 of the illegally terminated rancherias.  In 1983, the Courts reinstated the federal recognition of the illegally terminated tribes, including the Cloverdale Rancheria.

In 1994, the Highway 101 bypass cut through the Rancheria land, forcing tribal landowners to sell their property for the freeway.

In 2006, the tribe began efforts to revive and restore their traditional culture.  The tribe is also interested in opening up a casino.

Geography
Cloverdale is located in the northern portion of Sonoma County, about 85 miles (135 km) north of San Francisco; it is both the northernmost and westernmost city of the San Francisco Bay Area.

Cloverdale is located in Wine Country, being part of the Alexander Valley AVA.

Climate
According to the Köppen Climate Classification system, Cloverdale has a hot-summer Mediterranean climate, abbreviated "Csa" on climate maps. Temperatures in Cloverdale can exceed  and it is known for having hot, dry summers relative to the rest of Sonoma County.

Demographics

2010
At the 2010 census Cloverdale had a population of 8,618. The racial makeup of Cloverdale was 6,458 (74.9%) White, 48 (0.6%) African American, 156 (1.8%) Native American, 98 (1.1%) Asian, 7 (0.1%) Pacific Islander, 1,530 (17.8%) from other races, and 321 (3.7%) from two or more races. Hispanic or Latino of any race were 2,824 persons (32.8%).

The census reported that 8,530 people (99.0% of the population) lived in households, 22 (0.3%) lived in non-institutionalized group quarters, and 66 (0.8%) were institutionalized.

There were 3,182 households, 1,087 (34.2%) had children under the age of 18 living in them, 1,769 (55.6%) were opposite-sex married couples living together, 294 (9.2%) had a female householder with no husband present, 159 (5.0%) had a male householder with no wife present.  There were 232 (7.3%) unmarried opposite-sex partnerships, and 32 (1.0%) same-sex married couples or partnerships. 747 households (23.5%) were one person and 373 (11.7%) had someone living alone who was 65 or older. The average household size was 2.68.  There were 2,222 families (69.8% of households); the average family size was 3.16.

The age distribution was 2,054 people (23.8%) under the age of 18, 699 people (8.1%) aged 18 to 24, 2,154 people (25.0%) aged 25 to 44, 2,329 people (27.0%) aged 45 to 64, and 1,382 people (16.0%) who were 65 or older.  The median age was 39.7 years. For every 100 females, there were 99.5 males.  For every 100 females age 18 and over, there were 96.1 males.

There were 3,427 housing units at an average density of 1,294.4 per square mile, of the occupied units 2,102 (66.1%) were owner-occupied and 1,080 (33.9%) were rented. The homeowner vacancy rate was 4.1%; the rental vacancy rate was 4.9%.  5,522 people (64.1% of the population) lived in owner-occupied housing units and 3,008 people (34.9%) lived in rental housing units.

2000
At the 2000 census there were 6,831 people in 2,495 households, including 1,741 families, in the city. The racial makeup of the city was 68.7% White, 0.18% African American, 3.0% Native American, 1.04% Asian, 0.07% Pacific Islander, 2.30% from other races, and 15.3% from two or more races. Hispanic or Latino of any race were 26.7%.

Of the 2,495 households 36.4% had children under the age of 18 living with them, 55.3% were married couples living together, 9.1% had a female householder with no husband present, and 30.2% were non-families. 24.9% of households were one person and 12.7% were one person aged 65 or older.  The average household size was 2.71 and the average family size was 3.24.

The age distribution was 27.3% under the age of 18, 8.5% from 18 to 24, 28.3% from 25 to 44, 21.7% from 45 to 64, and 14.3% 65 or older.  The median age was 36 years. For every 100 females, there were 99.2 males.  For every 100 females age 18 and over, there were 96.5 males.

The median income for a household in the city was $42,309, and the median family income was $50,000. Males had a median income of $40,036 versus $26,610 for females. The per capita income for the city was $19,750.  About 7.2% of families and 10.4% of the population were below the poverty line, including 11.6% of those under age 18 and 9.5% of those age 65 or over.

Government

According to the California Secretary of State, as of February 10, 2019, Cloverdale has 4,745 registered voters. Of those, 2,293 (48.3%) are registered Democrats, 994 (20.9%) are registered Republicans, and 1,194 (25.2%) have declined to state a political party.

Infrastructure

Transportation
Cloverdale is at the junction of U.S. 101 and State Route 128.  The city operates Cloverdale Transit and Cloverdale Municipal Airport.  Inter-city transit is provided by Sonoma County Transit.
Plans to extend Sonoma–Marin Area Rail Transit (SMART), a commuter rail service in Sonoma and Marin counties, from its current northern terminus in Santa Rosa to Cloverdale will link the town to a bay ferry terminal in Larkspur. A train station for this purpose already exists on the town's south side.

Notable people
 Elsie Allen (1899–1990), Pomo basket maker and teacher regarded as one of the three best California basket makers of her generation
 Fairuza Balk (born 1974), actress, musician, and visual artist; she lived in Cloverdale as an infant
 Lana Clarkson (1962–2003), actress murdered by music producer Phil Spector; she grew up in Cloverdale 
 David Del Tredici (born 1937), Pulitzer Prize-winning 20th and 21st century classical music composer; he was born and spent the first four years of his life in Cloverdale
 Rich Rowland (born 1964), former catcher for the Detroit Tigers

See also
 Northwestern Pacific Railroad

References

External links

 

1872 establishments in California
Cities in Sonoma County, California
Cities in the San Francisco Bay Area
Incorporated cities and towns in California
Populated places established in 1872